There are a number of lakes named Diamond:

United States

See also

 List of lakes
 Lists of lakes